Cimolus is a genus of leaf-footed bugs in the family Coreidae. There are at least four described species in Cimolus.

Species
These four species belong to the genus Cimolus:
 Cimolus dilatatus (Dallas, 1852)
 Cimolus luteus Brailovsky, 2001
 Cimolus obscurus Stål, 1870
 Cimolus vitticeps Stål, 1862

References

Further reading

External links

Articles created by Qbugbot
Coreini
Coreidae genera